Lucile Petry Leone (January 23, 1902 – November 25, 1999) was an American nurse who was the founding director of the Cadet Nurse Corps in 1943. Because the Nurse Corps met its recruiting quotas, it was not necessary for the US to draft nurses in World War II. She was the first woman and the first nurse to be appointed as Assistant Surgeon General of the United States Public Health Service.

Origins
Born in 1902 in Frog Heaven, Ohio, Lucile was the only child of a high school principal and his wife. She was raised in Selbyville, Delaware. Lucile Petry completed a double major in chemistry and English at the University of Delaware in 1924. While attending the University of Delaware she worked as a nurses' assistant over the summer, confirming her interest in nursing. "I knew I wanted to work with both my hands and my head," Petry said. "I wanted to see science work. And I knew I wanted to work with people, not things."
She received a nursing degree from Johns Hopkins School of Nursing in 1927 in one and a half years, and during that time she held six different nursing positions. She served as head nurse, night supervisor, and in several wards including a psychiatric ward at Phipps Clinic. She earned a master's degree from Teachers College, Columbia University in 1929 on scholarship."

University of Minnesota School of Nursing
Petry's first position after earning her M.A. was assistant supervisor of clinical instruction at Yale for a summer. Then Petry was hired to be one of two instructors at the University of Minnesota School of Nursing in 1929.  Her initial role was to coordinate and update instruction and curriculum in the nursing school. She spent the next eleven years teaching nursing students and recruiting faculty and students to the school under the directorship of Katharine Jane Densford. She took one year during that period to earn her doctorate degree at Columbia Teachers College. Her role expanded to  Associate Professor and Assistant Dean for the 1937–1938 academic year, while Miss Densford took a sabbatical leave to work with the International Council of Nurses in London. Petry attended the convention of the National League of Nursing Education in  April, 1938. Petry was instrumental in laying the academic foundations for nursing education and the preparation for teachers and administrators.

World War II
From 1941 until 1966 Leone worked at the United States Public Health Service.
Initially she was 'on loan' to the US Public Health Service as an educational consultant, with the directive to accelerate nursing education nationally in the U.S. By 1943 various groups were organizing to provide for additional training for wartime nurses, including an effort by the American Legion Auxiliary to fund a 'Victory Nurse Corps'.
Then in June, 1943 Petry became the founding director of the Cadet Nurse Corps. 

Congress created the Cadet Nurse Corps via the Bolton Nurse Training Act, which provided federal funds for housing and training costs of educating nurses.

The cost of a student's tuition, fees, room, and board as well as a monthly stipend would be paid. Nursing schools were required to submit information and follow guidelines in order to participate, but there was minimal federal supervision of the curriculum. The training itself was not standardized. From July 1943 to October 1945, about 132,000 women were admitted to colleges across the country under the act. In exchange for federal funding, participating colleges were required to establish a 24- to 30-month accelerated education program for nurse candidates. And the women who enrolled had to pledge to "engage in essential nursing, military or civilian, for the duration of the war."

In return for that pledge, the government paid all tuition fees and a monthly stipend that ranged from $15 to $30, depending on the seniority of the nurse candidate, and supplied distinctive uniforms by fashion designer Molly Parnis.

In California, several hospitals took the lead in recruiting and training nurses for the Corps. These included Good Samaritan, Queen of Angels Hospital and St. Vincent's in Los Angeles and Huntington Memorial in Pasadena. After the war, those activities continued to be beneficial as those hospitals offered employment positions to nurses, breaking the contractor pattern that had been in place.

In May, 1944 in Washington, D.C. there was a joint ceremony marking the observance of the second annual national induction of the Cadet Nurse Corps. Thomas Parran, Surgeon General of the Public Health Service, led the 112,000 cadet nurses in the induction pledge, Petry gave remarks, and others including Eleanor Roosevelt, Frances Bolton, Helen Hayes and Bing Crosby paid tribute to them.  The Freedman's Hospital (later known as Howard University Hospital) joined with other schools of nursing in the District of Columbia and Alexandria, Virginia in a joint ceremony on Constitution Avenue, joined by the Cadet Nurse Glee Club. The ceremony was broadcast coast-to-coast on the Mutual Broadcasting network by the Public Health Service, Federal Security Agency.

On graduation, the cadet nurse had received a complete nursing education, and was eligible to become a registered nurse.

The program was a success, training 124,000 nurse cadets in basic schools, making it unnecessary to draft nurses for war service.

Post War Period

Petry was the chief nurse officer for the U.S. Public Health Service after the war. In June, 1949 Petry became the first nurse and the first woman to be promoted to assistant surgeon general of the U.S. Public Health Service. Simultaneously she was also an associate chief of the agency's Bureau of Medical Services. At that point she was rated the equivalent of a brigadier general in the health service.

On Petry's recommendation, the Division of Nursing Services of the Public Health Service launched a research grant and fellowship program. From those programs grew the National Center for Nursing Research and the National Institute for Nursing Research.

During the 1950s she was a member of the nursing advisory committee of the W. K. Kellogg Foundation. During the 1960s, she served as President of the National League for Nursing.

When she retired from government service in 1966, Lucile P. Leone was the Assistant Surgeon General and Chief Nurse Officer.

Leone participated in the first assembly of the World Health Organization as a delegate in 1948. In 1956 she was a delegate again, to the ninth assembly. Leone continued her career n nursing education, serving as Assistant Dean and a teacher of nursing at Texas Woman's University until 1971.

Personal life

She married Nicholas C. Leone in 1952. They divorced in 1967. She died on November 25, 1999, at the age of 97 in San Francisco, California.

Awards
Leone received the Florence Nightingale Medal of the International Red Cross and the Distinguished Service Award of the United States Public Health Service. She was named by the University of Maryland School of Nursing "as one of seven who significantly impacted the nursing profession." She was elected a member of the Institute of Medicine in 1970.

In 1955 the Lasker Foundation jointly awarded the Mary Woodland Lasker Public Service Award to Leone along with  Margaret Arnstein and Pearl McIver.

Petry was awarded honorary degrees from Syracuse University, Adelphia College, Wagner College and Hood College.

The Lucile Petry Leone Award was established by 2,500 members of the Public Health Service to honor Leone upon her retirement, and to encourage nursing leadership. It is presented biennially by the National League for Nursing "to an outstanding nurse educator."

Works
Petry, L. (1946). Foreword. In Katherine J. Densford and Millard S. Everett (Eds.). Ethics for Modern Nurses: Professional Adjustments I. Philadelphia, Pa: W.B. Saunders Company.
Petry, Lucile, Margaret Arnstein, and Pearl McIver. "Research for Improved Nursing Practices." Public Health Reports 67, no. 2 (1952): 183–88. Accessed May 11, 2021. doi:10.2307/4588035.

Leone, Lucile P. “The Changing Needs of People”, American Journal of Public Health 47, no. 1 (January 1, 1957): pp. 32–38.
Leone, Lucile P. Statewide Planning for Nursing Education. Atlanta: Southern Regional Education Board, 1967.

References

Further reading
 
 Robinson, T. M. (2000, Winter). Lucile Petry Leone (1902–1999) – we remember her. American Association for the History of Nursing Bulletin, 65, 9.
 National League of Nursing Education. (1945). Report of the U.S. Cadet Corps, Lucile Perry, Director., p. 336. Minutes of Board of Directors, January 22–26.
 Petty, L, & Spalding, E. K. (1943). Production front in nursing. American Journal of Nursing, 43(10), 900–901.
 Christy, T. (1969). Cornerstone for nursing education. New York: Teachers College Press.
 Brueggemann, D. W. (2000, Winter). Remembering Lucile Petry Leone. American Association for the History of Nursing Bulletin, 65, 9–10.
 National League for Nursing. (1963). Report of the President, Minutes of Board of Directors, January 28 – February 1.
 National League for Nursing. (1963). Report of the General Director for 1962. Minutes of Board of Directors, January 28 – February 1.
 
 Miller, J. (1950). Accreditation in Nursing Education. The American Journal of Nursing, 50(8), 483–486. doi:10.2307/3467692

External links
History of Nursing Archives, Howard Gottlieb Archival Research Center
Petry, Lucile (1902–1999), Encyclopedia.com 
 Lucile Petry 1903 - 1999 WorldCat

1902 births
1999 deaths
American nursing administrators
Female wartime nurses
United States Public Health Service personnel
People from Preble County, Ohio
University of Delaware alumni
Johns Hopkins School of Nursing alumni
Teachers College, Columbia University alumni
University of Minnesota faculty
Members of the National Academy of Medicine
Texas Woman's University faculty
World War II nurses
Nursing educators
Nursing school deans
American academic administrators
Florence Nightingale Medal recipients